The group of churches known as the Christian Churches and Churches of Christ is a fellowship of congregations within the Restoration Movement (also known as the Stone-Campbell Movement and the Reformation of the 19th Century) that have no formal denominational affiliation with other congregations, but still share many characteristics of belief and worship. Churches in this tradition are strongly congregationalist and have no formal denominational ties, and thus there is no proper name that is agreed to apply to the movement as a whole.  Most (but not all) congregations in this tradition include the words "Christian Church" or "Church of Christ" in their congregational name. Due to the lack of formal organization between congregations, there is a lack of official statistical data, but the 2016 Directory of the Ministry documents some 5000 congregations in the USA and Canada; some estimate the number to be over 6,000 since this directory is unofficial.

These congregations share historical roots with other, similarly named congregations within the Restoration Movement, including congregations organized within formal fellowships, such as the "Christian Church (Disciples of Christ)" or the "Churches of Christ". The congregations discussed in this article, however, have chosen to remain fully autonomous. Further distinguishing these congregations is their use of instrumental music within their worship, unlike the "Churches of Christ" who do not use instrumental music. The instrumental congregations discussed here and the a cappella "Churches of Christ" are otherwise very similar but have little contact with each other in most communities, although there is some cooperation among some larger churches and also in some educational institutions.

Congregational nomenclature

The churches are independent congregations and typically go by the name "Christian Church", but often use the name "church of Christ" as well.   Though isolated exceptions may occur, it is generally agreed within the movement that no personal or family names should be attached to a congregation which Christ purchased and established with his own blood, though geographical labels are acceptable. Thus, it is common for a congregation to be known as "[City Name] Christian Church,"  but in some areas they may be known as "[The/First] Christian Church [of/at] [City, Community, or Other Location Name]." In recent history, individual congregations have made the decision to change their formal name to break with traditional nomenclature and to adopt more generic names like "Christ's Church [of/at] [City Name]", "[City Name] Community Christian Church", or "[City Name] Community Fellowship". The tendency in Restoration churches to choose names such as "Christian Church" and "Church of Christ" can cause difficulties in identifying the affiliation (if any) of an individual church based solely on its name.  Furthermore, it is not uncommon for churches outside of the Restoration Movement to use similar names (see Church of Christ (disambiguation)).

Separation from the Disciples of Christ
The separation of the independent Christian churches and churches of Christ from the Christian Church (Disciples of Christ) (DoC) occurred over an extended period of time. The roots of the separation date back to a polarization that occurred during the early twentieth century as the result of three significant controversies.  These controversies surrounded theological modernism, the impact of the ecumenical movement, and open membership (recognizing as full members individuals who had not been baptized by immersion).

The Disciples of Christ were, in 1910, a united, growing community with common goals Support by the United Christian Missionary Society of missionaries who advocated open membership became a source of contention in 1920.  Efforts to recall support for these missionaries failed in a 1925 convention in Oklahoma City and a 1926 convention in Memphis, Tennessee. Many congregations withdrew from the missionary society as a result.

A new convention, the North American Christian Convention, was organized by the more conservative congregations in 1927. An existing brotherhood journal, the Christian Standard, also served as a source of cohesion for these congregations. From the 1960s on, newer unaffiliated missionary organizations like the Christian Missionary Fellowship (today, Christian Missionary Fellowship International) were working more on a national scale to rally Christian Church/Church of Christ congregations in international missions. By this time the division between liberals and conservatives was well established.

The official separation between the independent Christian Churches/Churches of Christ and the Christian Church (Disciples of Christ) is difficult to date. Suggestions range from 1926 to 1971 based on the events outlined below:

 1926: The first North American Christian Convention (NACC) in 1927 was the result of disillusionment at the DoC Memphis Convention.
 1944: International Convention of Disciples elects as president a proponent of open membership
 1948: The Commission on Restudy, appointed to help avoid a split, disbands
 1955: The Directory of the Ministry was first published listing only the "Independents" on a voluntary basis.
 1968: Final redaction of the Disciples Year Book removing Independent churches
 1971: Independent churches listed separately in the Yearbook of American Churches.

Identity
Because the Christian churches and churches of Christ are independent congregations there is no set creed, but The Directory of the Ministry contains the following general description:

Members of Christian Churches and churches of Christ believe in the deity and Lordship of Jesus Christ, the inspiration of the Bible, and the autonomy of local congregations. Following the basic principles of the 'Restoration Movement', they accept and teach believers' baptism by immersion into Christ for the forgiveness of sins; they assemble for worship on the first day of the week, making the observance of the Lord's Supper a focal point in such worship. They seek the unity of all believers on the basis of faith in and obedience to Christ as the divine Son of God and the acceptance of the Bible particularly the New Testament as their all-sufficient rule of faith and practice.

Baptism

Of the principles cited above, one characteristic marks most Christian Churches and Churches of Christ as distinctly different from other modern Evangelical Christian groups today. That is the teaching that a person receives the remission of sins, during his baptism. Baptism is:

 by immersion,
 for publicly confessing believers in Jesus Christ [Acts 8:37],
 a work of God's grace, not a work of man [Col 2:12],
 a promise received through obedient submission [Acts 2:40, 41],
 necessarily accompanied with confession of sinfulness and repentance [Acts 2:38; Acts 3:19; Rom 10:9,10],
 the occasion when one receives God's forgiveness  for their sins [Acts 2:36-37; Acts 2:40-41],
 the occasion when one calls on His name for salvation [Acts 22:16],
 the occasion when the equipping, indwelling Holy Spirit is received as a seal and promise of heaven [Acts 2:38; Titus 3:5],
 a "circumcision" or transformation of the believer's heart by the hands of Christ himself [Col 2:11,12],
 foreshadowed in the Old Testament ceremonial washings, now fulfilled in a believer's shared experience with Christ [Heb 10:22],
 sharing in the death, burial, and resurrection of Christ [Rom 6:4], and the only assurance of the hope of the resurrection from the dead [Rom 6:5-7],
 specifically emphasized and commanded by Christ in his brief closing remarks ("The Great Commission") before ascending into heaven,
 not only an outward sign of an inward change, but is both simultaneously [e.g. "born again" John 3:4, 5],
 one baptism indeed, both physically in water and spiritually in the blood of Jesus [Eph 4:5; John 3:5],
 entry into the body of Christ at large, and hence, the only viable entry into the membership of a local congregation of the Independent Christian Churches and Churches of Christ (as in the Church of Christ (non-instrumental), a candidate for membership is not usually required to be re-baptized if they have previously been "baptized into Christ" in accordance with the above general understanding and/or guidelines) [Eph 4:5].

Educational institutions
The Christian Churches/churches of Christ support a variety of Bible colleges and seminaries.  Because there is no official "denominational" structure in the movement, the local colleges often serve as information centers and allow the local churches to maintain connections with each other.

India

Canada

Philippines

United States

Defunct schools
Puget Sound Christian College, opened in 1950 but closed in 2007.
Cincinnati Christian University, opened in 1924 but closed in 2019.

Creeds and Slogans
A number of creeds and slogans have been used in the Restoration Movement to express some of the distinctive themes of the Movement. These include:

 "Where the Scriptures speak, we speak; where the Scriptures are silent, we are silent."
 "The church of Jesus Christ on earth is essentially, intentionally, and constitutionally one."
 "We are Christians only, but not the only Christians."
 "In essentials, unity; in opinions, liberty; in all things love."
 "No creed but Christ, no book but the Bible, no law but love, no name but the divine."
 "Call Bible things by Bible names."

See also

Christianity
Christian Church
Restoration Movement
Churches of Christ
Christian Church (Disciples of Christ)
Christian primitivism
Sponsoring church (Churches of Christ)
Churches of Christ (non-institutional)

References

Citations

Sources
 
 

 
Restoration Movement
Restoration Movement denominations
Arminian denominations